Fermi–Dirac integral may refer to:
 Complete Fermi–Dirac integral
 Incomplete Fermi–Dirac integral